Heroes of the Environment was a list of a year's most notable environmentalists chosen and compiled by Time magazine.

The award was established in 2007.

Heroes of the Environment (2007).
Heroes of the Environment (2008).
Heroes of the Environment (2009).

See also

Champions of the Earth
 List of environmental awards

References

Environmental awards
Time (magazine)
Awards by magazines
Culture and the environment

Awards established in 2007
2007 establishments in the United States
2007 in the environment